Henry Albert Reed (17 May 1892 – 3 May 1963) was an English cricketer. Reed's batting style is unknown. He was born at Bristol.

Reed made his first-class debut for Gloucestershire against Essex in 1921 County Championship. He made five further first-class appearances for the county, the last of which came against Essex in the 1923 County Championship. In his six first-class matches for Gloucestershire, he scored a total of 110 runs at an average of 9.16, with a high score of 45.

He died at Redland, Bristol, on 3 May 1963.

References

External links
Henry Reed at ESPNcricinfo
Henry Reed at CricketArchive

1892 births
1963 deaths
Cricketers from Bristol
English cricketers
Gloucestershire cricketers